Epidemie (Epidemics) is the fifth studio album by the Polish heavy metal band Turbo. It was released in 1989 in Poland through Polskie Nagrania Muza. In 1990 an English version of the album entitled Epidemic was released through Metalmaster Records.

The album was recorded in March–May 1989 at Giełda studio in Poznań. The cover art was created by Jerzy Kurczak.

Track listing

Personnel

 Turbo
Grzegorz Kupczyk – vocal
Wojciech Hoffmann – guitar
Robert "Litza" Friedrich  – guitar
Andrzej Łysów – bass guitar
Tomasz Goehs – drums

Tomasz Dziubiński - producer
Jerzy Kurczak - artwork

References

1989 albums
Turbo (Polish band) albums
Polish-language albums